Season 1997–98 saw Livingston compete in the Scottish Second Division. They also competed in the Challenge Cup, League Cup and the Scottish Cup.

Summary
In their second season in the Second Division, Livingston finished third, narrowly missing out on promotion by one point. They reached the second round of the Challenge Cup, the second round of the League Cup and the third round of the Scottish Cup.

Results & fixtures

Second Division

Challenge Cup

League Cup

Scottish Cup

Statistics

League table

References

Livingston
Livingston F.C. seasons